BBC Radio 1 Live in Concert is a live album by Steve Earle. The album was recorded 29 November 1988 at The Town & Country Club, London and released in 1992.  The album was re-released as Live At The BBC in 2009 with an additional four tracks recorded for Liz Kershaw's show, recorded live in Manchester on 16 April 1987.

Track listing
All songs written by Steve Earle unless otherwise noted.
"Copperhead Road" - 4:25
"San Antonio Girl" - 2:45
"Even When I'm Blue" - 4:00
"My Old Friend the Blues" - 2:50
"Someday" - 3:45
"The Devil's Right Hand" - 2:55
"Down the Road" - 3:05 (Tony Brown, Steve Earle, Jimbeau Hinson)
"Snake Oil" - 7:45
"Johnny Come Lately" - 3:20
"When Will We Be Married?" - 4:10 (Traditional)
"Little Rock & Roller" - 4:45
"Dead Flowers" - 5:35 (Mick Jagger, Keith Richards)
"My Baby Worships Me" - 3:25

2009 Edition (released as Live at the BBC) Bonus Tracks:
14. "Fearless Heart" - 4:05
15. "Good Ole Boy (Getting Tough)" - 3:57
16. "Hillbilly Highway" (Steve Earle, Jimbeau Hinson) - 3:39
17. "I Love You Too Much" - 4:06

References
 

BBC Radio recordings
Steve Earle live albums
1992 live albums